Cecil Delisle Burns (26 January 1879 – 22 January 1942) was a leading English atheist and secularist writer and lecturer.

Early life

Burns was born in Saint Kitts and Nevis, West Indies where his father was treasurer of St. Christopher-Nevis in the Leeward Islands. After leaving Christ's College, Cambridge, he was trained in Rome for the priesthood, but left the Church in 1908 and devoted time to the study of social problems in a wider sense. In 1912, he married the painter Margaret Hannay: the sister of Alexander Howard Hannay, art critic of the famous "London Mercury". 

He was appointed as a regular lecturer at South Place Ethical Society, at Conway Hall in London, in 1918 and continued to lecture there until his health deteriorated in September 1934.

He was a lecturer at Birkbeck College, University of London; the London School of Economics and as Stevenson Lecturer in Citizenship at the University of Glasgow.

Bibliography

 The Devil: London,1909.
 International politics London: Methuen & Co. Ltd., 1920.
 Leisure and the Modern World London: George Allen & Unwin Ltd., 1932.
 The Contact Between Minds: a metaphysical hypothesis London: Macmillan and Co., Limited, 1923.
 The Horizon of Experience London: George Allen & Unwin Ltd, 1933.
 The First Europe: a study of the establishment of medieval Christendom, A.D. 400-800 London: George Allen & Unwin, 1947.
 War and a changing civilisation, London: John Lane The Bodley Head Ltd., 1934
 Challenge to Democracy, New York: W. W. Norton and Company. 1935 . Pp. viii, 240.

References

1879 births
1942 deaths
20th-century English writers
Academics of Birkbeck, University of London
Academics of the London School of Economics
Alumni of Christ's College, Cambridge
British atheists
British educational theorists
British humanists
British secularists
People associated with Conway Hall Ethical Society
People associated with the University of Glasgow